Aquamavirus is a genus of viruses in the order Picornavirales, in the family Picornaviridae. Seals serve as natural hosts. Only one species is in this genus: Aquamavirus A.

Structure
Viruses in Aquamavirus are nonenveloped, with icosahedral, spherical, and round geometries, and T=pseudo3 symmetry. The diameter is around 30 nm. Genomes are linear and nonsegmented, around 6.7 kb in length.

Lifecycle
Viral replication is cytoplasmic. Entry into the host cell is achieved by attachment of the virus to host receptors, which mediates endocytosis. Replication follows the positive-stranded RNA virus replication model. Positive-stranded RNA virus transcription is the method of transcription. The virus exits the host cell by lysis, and viroporins. Seals serve as the natural hosts.

References

External links
 Viralzone: Aquamavirus
 ICTV

Picornaviridae
Virus genera